Marc Rosset was the defending champion, but lost in the first round this year.

Pete Sampras won the title, beating Olivier Delaître 6–1, 6–1 in the final.

Seeds

Draw

Finals

Top half

Bottom half

References

 Main Draw

1991 ATP Tour